Telmatobius pinguiculus is a species of frog in the family Telmatobiidae.
It is endemic to the Catamarca Province of Argentina.
Its natural habitats are rivers located in wetlands and grasslands.  Major threats to the survival of the species include pollution, loss of habitats due to human actions, and invasive species.

References

pinguiculus
Amphibians of the Andes
Amphibians of Argentina
Endemic fauna of Argentina
Taxa named by Raymond Laurent
Amphibians described in 1989
Taxonomy articles created by Polbot